Aisling Louise McCarthy (born 24 February 1996) is an Australian rules footballer playing for West Coast in the AFL Women's (AFLW). She became an Australian citizen in July 2022.

Early life 
From Cahir, County Tipperary in Ireland, McCarthy began playing Gaelic football from the age of seven. She also played camogie, captaining her club Cahir to victory in the 2016 All-Ireland intermediate finals. In 2017, McCarthy was the player of the match in Tipperary's victory in the All-Ireland Intermediate Ladies' Football Championship, scoring one goal and four points. She was also named the TG4 Intermediate Player's Player of the Year.

Her interest in Australian football began in 2015 when Colin O'Riordan, a Tipperary footballer, moved to the Sydney Swans. In September 2018, she was among 18 international prospects to attend the CrossCoders program, a week-long Australian football camp held in Melbourne.

AFLW career 
McCarthy was drafted by the Western Bulldogs with pick 23 in the 2018 AFLW national draft. She debuted in round 2 of the 2019 season against  at Whitten Oval, kicking her first goal in the third quarter. At the season's conclusion, McCarthy re-signed with the Bulldogs for the 2020 season; she played six matches and kicked five goals in her first year. After a second year with the Bulldogs playing more as a midfielder and kicking two goals from 6 games, McCarthy finished 4th in the Bulldogs Best and Fairest. McCarthy came runner up in the  best and fairest voting in 2021, with a total of 37 votes, just 3 votes behind first placed Isabella Lewis. McCarthy signed a two-year contract with the Eagles on 26 June 2021, keeping her with the team until the end of the 2023 season.

Statistics
Statistics are correct the end of the 2021 season.

|- style="background-color: #eaeaea"
! scope="row" style="text-align:center" | 2019
|style="text-align:center;"|
| 15 || 6 || 5 || 1 || 41 || 20 || 61 || 11 || 15 || 0.8 || 0.2 || 6.8 || 3.3 || 10.2 || 1.8 || 2.5 || 0
|- 
! scope="row" style="text-align:center" | 2020
|style="text-align:center;"|
| 15 || 6 || 2 || 3 || 54 || 27 || 81 || 20 || 24 || 0.3 || 0.5 || 9.5 || 4.0 || 13.5 || 3.3 || 4.0 || 0
|- style="background-color: #eaeaea"
! scope="row" style="text-align:center" | 2021
|style="text-align:center;"|
| 11 || 7 || 2 || 2 || 69 || 30 || 99 || 10 || 32 || 0.3 || 0.3 || 9.9 || 4.3 || 14.1 || 1.4 || 4.6 || 3
|- class="sortbottom"
! colspan=3| Career
! 19
! 9
! 6
! 167
! 74
! 241
! 41
! 71
! 0.5
! 0.3
! 8.8
! 3.9
! 12.7
! 2.2
! 3.7
! 3
|}

References

External links 

Living people
1996 births
People from Cahir
Irish female players of Australian rules football
Ladies' Gaelic footballers who switched code
Western Bulldogs (AFLW) players
Tipperary camogie players
Irish expatriate sportspeople in Australia
Dual camogie–football players
Tipperary ladies' Gaelic footballers
West Coast Eagles (AFLW) players